Ramón López Fleites (born 16 January 1936) is a Cuban athlete. He competed in the men's triple jump at the 1960 Summer Olympics.

References

External links
 

1936 births
Living people
Athletes (track and field) at the 1960 Summer Olympics
Cuban male triple jumpers
Cuban male high jumpers
Olympic athletes of Cuba
Pan American Games medalists in athletics (track and field)
Pan American Games silver medalists for Cuba
Athletes (track and field) at the 1955 Pan American Games
Athletes (track and field) at the 1963 Pan American Games
Medalists at the 1963 Pan American Games
Central American and Caribbean Games medalists in athletics
People from Santa Clara, Cuba
20th-century Cuban people